Escape from Singe's Castle, also known as Dragon's Lair Part II - Escape From Singe's Castle, is a computer game for the Amstrad CPC, Commodore 64 and ZX Spectrum home computers, released by Software Projects in 1987. ReadySoft released it for the PC (developed by Bethesda Softworks) in 1989, and for the Amiga and Atari ST in 1990 and 1991, respectively. An Apple IIGS version was released in 2022. The game is sometimes referred to as Dragon's Lair II, but is not the official arcade sequel Dragon's Lair II: Time Warp.

Gameplay 
Players control Dirk the Daring, the player character from Dragon's Lair, who has returned to the lair of Singe the dragon in order to claim a pot of gold (to save Daphne again in the 16 bit version). Singe has laid traps throughout his lair, forcing players to guide Dirk across a number of differently themed screens in order to steal the gold and escape. In the 8 bit versions there are eight different levels.

Development 
Software Projects had licensed the Coleco Adam version of Dragon's Lair to be released on 8-bit home computers, but due to the limitations of memory size and media space very few scenes could be contained in the conversion. Therefore, a second game entitled Escape from Singe's Castle was created to contain some of the missing scenes. Some retained the original control method of only allowing a directional movement at the right time. Other sections had a smaller, more controllable Dirk.

The Commodore 64 cassette version features the same loading system as the original Dragon's Lair conversion - the next game level loads while the player attempts the current level.

The Amiga version had a hard disk install option that supported the first Dragon's Lair conversion; a user that owned the first and second games could install scenes from both, resulting in a single bigger game. The American Commodore 64 version had a two-sided disk, with the first Dragon's Lair on the other side of the disk (however, the front cover only showed the name Dragon's Lair).

An Apple IIGS version had reportedly been completed by ReadySoft and scheduled to be released in 1991 (manuals from other ports list detailed IIGS-specific loading instructions and features) but was never publicly released. In 2022, decades later with the original ReadySoft port still missing or lost, Brutal Deluxe created and released a new Apple IIGS port based on the PC version.

Reception
Allen L. Greenberg reviewed the game for Computer Gaming World, and stated that "Dragon's Lair II: Escape From Singe's Castle is an odd creature, an exceptional program which suffers from uninteresting game-play."

Reviews
Amtix! (Apr, 1987)
Computer Gamer (Mar, 1987)
Zzap! (Feb, 1987)
Computer and Video Games (Jul, 1990)
Commodore User (Feb, 1987)
Popular Computing Weekly (Jan 29, 1987)
Your Sinclair (May, 1987)
ASM (Aktueller Software Markt) (Feb, 1987)
Tilt (Jun, 1987)
Happy Computer (Mar, 1987)
Your Sinclair (Jul, 1990)
Amiga Computing (May, 1990)
The Games Machine (May, 1990)
Commodore User (Apr, 1990)
Zzap! (May, 1990)
Zero (Jun, 1990)
The One (Apr, 1990)
Génération 4 (Apr, 1990)
Games-X (Nov, 1991)
ST Format (Feb, 1992)

References

External links 
 
 Escape from Singe's Castle at Lemon64
 Escape from Singe's Castle at World of Spectrum

1987 video games
Amiga games
Amstrad CPC games
Apple IIGS games
Atari ST games
Commodore 64 games
DOS games
Dragon's Lair
Classic Mac OS games
Video games developed in the United Kingdom
ZX Spectrum games
Bethesda Softworks games
Electronic Arts games
Single-player video games
Software Projects games